Judah ben Isaac Cardinal (or Cardineal) was a translator who lived at the end of the twelfth century and the beginning of the thirteenth, probably in Southern France.

At the request of Joseph ben Baruch, who, according to Leopold Zunz, traveled from France to Jerusalem by way of Egypt in 1211, Cardinal translated from Arabic into Hebrew Judah ha-Levi's Kuzari. This translation, which, with the exception of several small fragments, is no longer in existence, was used by Nathanael ben Nehemiah Kaspi in his commentary on the Kuzari entitled 'Edut le-Yisrael, and also by Judah ben Joseph Moscato in his commentary Qol Yehudah.

References
 Wolf, Bibl. Hebr. i. 772;
 Giovanni Bernardo De Rossi, Dizionario, p. 162;
 Dukes, in Orient. Lit. 1840, p. 588; 1849, p. 453;
 David Cassel, Cuzari, p. 20;
 Moritz Steinschneider, Hebr. Übers. p. 404;
 Leopold Zunz, Notes on Benjamin of Tudela, ed. Asher, ii. 256.G.

12th-century births
13th-century deaths
12th-century translators
13th-century translators
13th-century French writers
Arabic–Hebrew translators
French translators
French male non-fiction writers
Writers of lost works